Chotyłów  is a village in the administrative district of Gmina Piszczac, within Biała Podlaska County, Lublin Voivodeship, in eastern Poland.

The village has an approximate population of 900.

References

Villages in Biała Podlaska County